El Súper Joe (The Super Joe) is the twenty-second and last studio album by Colombian musician singer-songwriter Joe Arroyo, released in 2007.  Under the label Discos Fuentes. In 2008 the album received a Latin Grammy Award nomination as Best Contemporary Tropical Album.

Track listing

References 

Joe Arroyo albums
Discos Fuentes albums
2007 albums